Elnesvågen og Omegn IL is a Norwegian sports club from Hustadvika, Møre og Romsdal. It has sections for football, handball and athletics.

The club was founded in 1993, as a merge between Fræna FK and Elnesvågen IL, but the club official founding date is 3 September 1922 - inherited by the oldest parent clubs.

The men's football team currently resides in the Third Division (fourth tier), where its current stint began in 2005.

References

External links
Official site
Official site - Football department

Athletics clubs in Norway
Football clubs in Norway
Association football clubs established in 1922
1922 establishments in Norway
Sport in Møre og Romsdal
Hustadvika (municipality)